Sebastian Early Payne (born 2 July 1989) is a British journalist who is director of the think tank Onward. He was previously Whitehall editor of the Financial Times.

Early life 
Payne was born "six weeks early", on 2 July 1989, in Gateshead, England. He attended St Thomas More Catholic School, Blaydon, before moving to the independent Dame Allan's School for sixth form, where he began studying politics. At Durham University, he studied Computer Science, but "didn't really enjoy it from about the third week in". He was media editor of the student newspaper Palatinate, and manager of Purple Radio, a student radio station where he also presented a show. During his year-long tenure as manager, Purple Radio received a fine from PRS for Music for not paying any fees for playing music on the station for five years. He was a bassist for a band, The Gatefold, which performed in the Durham area. He ran for president of his junior common room, but lost by 40 votes. He graduated from the university's Van Mildert College in 2010 with a Bachelor of Science.

After graduation, Payne did an internship on the media desk of The Guardian, when he contributed to reporting on the manhunt for fugitive Raoul Moat. He obtained a Master of Arts in investigative journalism from City, University of London in 2011.

Career 
Payne became a data reporter at The Daily Telegraph in 2011, before leaving the newspaper the following year. He was an online editor of The Spectator magazine and the deputy editor of its Coffee House blog from 2012 to 2015. He was also managing editor of the magazine. During his time at The Spectator he spent nine months in a Laurence Stern fellowship at the national desk of The Washington Post.

Payne joined the Financial Times as digital opinion editor at the beginning of 2016. He became the newspaper's political leader writer, before being appointed Whitehall correspondent in March 2019. In the role, he specialised in the Conservative Party, Brexit and foreign policy. He wrote a fortnightly political opinion column and presented the weekly Payne's Politics podcast. He appeared regularly on the BBC and Sky News. In 2019, he was named by the Evening Standard as one of the most influential journalists in London. He spoke that year at the Battle of Ideas festival on the North–South divide of England.

In September 2020 Pan Macmillan announced that after a four-way auction it had secured Payne's book, Broken Heartlands: A Journey Through Labour's Lost England, about the red wall areas that voted Conservative in the 2019 general election. It was published in autumn 2021. 

Payne was named by The Times as a contender to be political editor of BBC News following the announcement of Laura Kuenssberg's departure from the position.

In July 2022 Pan Macmillan secured The Fall of Boris Johnson, Payne's book about Prime Minister Boris Johnson's downfall, which was published in November 2022.

In December 2022 Payne announced that he was leaving the Financial Times to become director of the think tank Onward.

Personal life 
Payne lives in Crouch End, North London. He married Sophia Gaston, then director of think tank The British Foreign Policy Group and London School of Economics academic fellow, on 20 July 2019.

His musical interests include Talking Heads and Pink Floyd, and he also has an interest in photography.

Bibliography
 Broken Heartlands: A Journey Through Labour's Lost England (Pan Macmillan, 2021) 
 The Fall of Boris Johnson (Pan Macmillan, 2022)

References

External links 
 Sebastian Payne at the Financial Times

1989 births
Living people
People educated at Dame Allan's School
Alumni of Van Mildert College, Durham
Alumni of City, University of London
British journalists
British male journalists
21st-century British journalists
British newspaper journalists
British political journalists
The Daily Telegraph people
The Spectator people
The Washington Post journalists
Financial Times people
People from Gateshead
Writers from Tyne and Wear